The 2001 season is the Philadelphia Charge's first season competing in the Women's United Soccer Association league, the top division of women's soccer in the United States, and first competitive season. The team was coached by  Mark Krikorian.

Review

Team formation
After establishing the team in November 2000, the inaugural roster for the Philadelphia Charge began to form through a series of drafts organized by WUSA. All eight teams first participated in the WUSA Player Allocation intended to distribute top players, notably from the American team that won the 1999 FIFA Women's World Cup the previous year. The Charge were first allocated US international midfielder Lorrie Fair, being the team's first official player. Goalkeeper, Saskia Webber, and forward, Mandy Clemens finished out the initial allocation for the 2001 season.

After distribution of domestic talent, WUSA hosted the WUSA Foreign Player Allocation, assigning rights of foreign players amongst the eight teams. The Charge drafted German international defender Doris Fitschen and English midfielder Kelly Smith, both signed before the start of the season.

With domestic and international talent allocated, the Charge announced in November 2000 that University of Hartford women's soccer coach, Mark Krikorian, would be appointed the first head coach of the team. Prior to the start of the season, Krikorian would bring on former Swedish international Pia Sundhage and John Natale as assistant coaches. Rosters were filled out in December 2000, where the league hosted the first WUSA Draft Notable acquisitions for the Charge included Chinese international midfielder, Liu Ailing, US international defender, Heather Mitts, and US international midfielder Laurie Schwoy.

First season
The Charge played their first match in team history away at San Diego Spirit earning their first win. The team's first goal was a penalty kick scored by Doris Fitschen, followed up by a 62nd minute goal from Kelly Smith. The Charge would finish their first season 4th in the standings, securing the final spot in the first WUSA Playoffs. On August 18, the Charge played their post season match at Atlanta Beat, losing in extra time 3-2, Philadelphia goals scored by Kelly Smith and Mandy Clemens.

Liu Ailing emerged as the primary scoring threat for the Charge, scoring 10 goals in the regular season from 19 starts and registering the team's first hattrick against Carolina Courage.

Club

Roster
The first-team roster of Philadelphia Charge.

Team management
{| class="wikitable" style="text-align:left;"
|-
!  style="background:#da2736; color:#FFFFFF; border:2px solid #041C2C;"|Position
!  style="background:#da2736; color:#FFFFFF; border:2px solid #041C2C;"|Staff Member
|-
| Head coach ||  Mark Krikorian
|-
| Assistant coach ||  Pia Sundhage
|-
| Assistant coach ||  John Natale

Competition

Regular season

Results by round

Home/away results

Regular-season standings

Playoffs

Statistics

Players without any appearance are not included.

|-
|colspan="14"|Goalkeepers:
|-

|-
|colspan="14"|Defenders:
|-

|-
|colspan="14"|Midfielders:
|-

|-
|colspan="14"|Forwards:
|-

Goalkeepers

Record = W-L-D

Transfers

In

Out

Honors
2001 WUSA Defensive Player of the Year:  Doris Fitschen

References

External links
 Philadelphia Charge website (archive.org)

Philadelphia Charge
2001 in Philadelphia
American soccer clubs 2001 season
2001 in American sports
2001 Women's United Soccer Association season
Sports in Pennsylvania by year